Illach is a river in Bavaria, Germany. It flows into the Lech near Steingaden.

See also
List of rivers of Bavaria

References

Rivers of Bavaria
Rivers of Germany